Abdul Karim Kallon (born April 5, 1969) is an American lawyer who is a former United States district judge of the United States District Court for the Northern District of Alabama. He is a former nominee to be a United States circuit judge of the United States Court of Appeals for the Eleventh Circuit.

Early life and education 

Born in Freetown, Sierra Leone, Kallon earned an Artium Baccalaureus degree from Dartmouth College in 1990. He earned a Juris Doctor in 1993 from the University of Pennsylvania Law School, where he served as Articles Editor for the University of Pennsylvania Journal of International Business Law. Kallon served as a law clerk for Judge U. W. Clemon of the United States District Court for the Northern District of Alabama from 1993 to 1994. In 2020, Kallon graduated from Duke Law School with a Master of Laws in judicial studies.

Career 

From 1994 to his judicial appointment, Kallon worked in private legal practice in Birmingham, Alabama. He practiced labor and employment law as a partner at the Birmingham law firm Bradley Arant Boult Cummings LLP.

Federal judicial service 

On July 31, 2009, President Barack Obama nominated Kallon to be a judge on the United States District Court for the Northern District of Alabama. Kallon was nominated for the seat vacated by Clemon, who retired earlier in 2009. According to news accounts, Kallon had been recommended for the judgeship by a panel of legal experts assembled by United States Representative Artur Davis. However, his name was not on a list of candidates compiled by a committee of the Alabama Democratic Party. The United States Senate confirmed Kallon to his judgeship by unanimous consent on November 21, 2009. He received his commission on January 4, 2010.

On February 11, 2016, President Obama nominated Kallon to serve as a circuit judge of the United States Court of Appeals for the Eleventh Circuit, to the seat vacated by Judge Joel Fredrick Dubina, who took senior status on October 26, 2013. His nomination expired on January 3, 2017, with the end of the 114th Congress.

On April 6, 2022, Kallon announced he would resign from the court effective August 31, 2022.

See also
 Barack Obama judicial appointment controversies
 List of African-American federal judges
 List of African-American jurists

References

External links

1969 births
Living people
African-American judges
21st-century American judges
21st-century American lawyers
Dartmouth College alumni
Judges of the United States District Court for the Northern District of Alabama
Lawyers from Birmingham, Alabama
People from Freetown
Sierra Leonean emigrants to the United States
United States district court judges appointed by Barack Obama
University of Pennsylvania Law School alumni